Armando Albano (19 July 1909 – 12 June 1942) was a Brazilian basketball player. He competed in the men's tournament at the 1936 Summer Olympics.

Albano died after collapsing at half time of a match between Botafogo Football Club and Clube de Regatas Botafogo.

References

External links
 

1909 births
1942 deaths
Brazilian men's basketball players
Olympic basketball players of Brazil
Basketball players at the 1936 Summer Olympics
Place of birth missing
Basketball players from Rio de Janeiro (city)